James Francis Wulff (March 22, 1936 – February 19, 2000) was an American football defensive back and halfback in the National Football League (NFL) for the Washington Redskins.  He played college football at Michigan State University.

Early life
Wulff was born in Chicago, Illinois, to the late James and Frances (Huber) Wulff.  He attended St. George High School in Evanston, Illinois, where he played football and basketball.  In 1993, Wulff was inducted into the Chicago Catholic League Athletic Coaches Association Hall of Fame.

College career
Wulff attended and played college football at Michigan State University.  He played in the 1956 Rose Bowl, in which Michigan State Spartans defeated the UCLA Bruins, 17–14.  He graduated in 1958.

Professional career
Wulff was drafted in the sixth round (72nd overall) of the 1958 NFL Draft by the Cleveland Browns. He was then traded to the Washington Redskins for a tenth round pick in the 1961 NFL Draft.

Personal life
After retiring from professional football, Wulff moved from Washington, D.C., to St. Charles, Illinois, and opened Jim Wulff Chevrolet, which operated for nine years.  He then moved to Michigan, where he purchased and operated the Elk River Motel in Elk Rapids, Michigan.  He was married to Mary Kay Georgen, with two children( Susan Wulff and Cathy Wulff Merz), and died on February 19, 2000, at Munson Medical Center in Traverse City, Michigan.

Wulff served in the National Guard of the United States.

References

External links
 

1936 births
2000 deaths
Players of American football from Chicago
American football running backs
American football safeties
Michigan State Spartans football players
Washington Redskins players
People from Elk Rapids, Michigan